Dömitz-Malliß is an Amt in the Ludwigslust-Parchim district, in Mecklenburg-Vorpommern, Germany. The seat of the Amt is in Dömitz.

The Amt Dömitz-Malliß consists of the following municipalities:
 Dömitz
 Grebs-Niendorf
 Karenz
 Malk Göhren
 Malliß
 Neu Kaliß
 Vielank

Ämter in Mecklenburg-Western Pomerania